Charles Edward Herbert (12 June 1860 – 21 January 1929) was an Australian politician and judge. He was a member of the South Australian House of Assembly from 1900 to 1905, representing the electorate of Northern Territory. He was Government Resident of the Northern Territory from 1905 to 1910. He was then deputy chief judicial officer of the Territory of Papua (later Judge of the Central Court of Papua) from 1910 to 1928. This role saw him serve for extended periods on the Executive Council of Papua, and act as its Administrator and Lieutenant-Governor. During this period, he served as an acting judge of the Supreme Court of the Northern Territory in 1921. He was appointed Administrator of Norfolk Island in 1928, holding the position until his death in 1929.

References

 

1860 births
1929 deaths
20th-century Australian judges
Members of the South Australian House of Assembly
Administrators of Norfolk Island
Government Resident of the Northern Territory
Territory of Papua judges
Judges of the Supreme Court of the Northern Territory